The 2012 Match des Champions was the 7th edition of the annual super cup game in French basketball. This year the reigning LNB Pro A champions Élan Chalon faced off against French Cup champions Limoges CSP.

Match

References

2012
Match